Benifallet is a municipality in the comarca of Baix Ebre, in the province of Tarragona, in Catalonia, Spain.

This town is located by the Ebro River, below the Cardó Massif. It is popular among kayakers who make trips down the final Ebro Gorges.

There are also locally arranged trips on rafts and kayaks down the Ebro Gorges.

References

External links 

 Pàgina web de l'Ajuntament
 Government data pages 

Municipalities in Baix Ebre
Populated places in Baix Ebre